The 2022 FIBA U20 European Championship was the 23rd edition of the European basketball championship for national under-20 teams. It was played from 16 to 24 July 2022 in Podgorica, Montenegro. Spain men's national under-20 basketball team won the tournament and became the European champions for the third time.

Participating teams
  (Third place, 2019 FIBA U20 European Championship Division B)

  (Runners-up, 2019 FIBA U20 European Championship Division B)

  (Winners, 2019 FIBA U20 European Championship Division B)

First round
The draw of the first round was held on 15 February 2022 in Freising, Germany.

In the first round, the teams were drawn into four groups of four. All teams advance to the playoffs.

Group A

Group B

Group C

Group D

Playoffs

Main bracket

5th place bracket

9th place bracket

13th place bracket

Awards

Most Valuable Player

All-Tournament Team

  Juan Núñez
  Fedor Žugić
  Noam Dovrat
  Mantas Rubštavičius
  Adem Bona

Final standings

See also
 2022 FIBA U20 European Championship Division B

References

External links
Official website

2022
2022–23 in European basketball
International youth basketball competitions hosted by Montenegro
FIBA U20
July 2022 sports events in Europe
Sports competitions in Podgorica